The Catalogue of Principal Galaxies (PGC) is an astronomical catalog published in 1989 that lists B1950 and J2000 equatorial coordinates and cross-identifications for 73,197 galaxies. A total of 131,601 names from the 38 most common sources are listed. Available mean data for each object are given:

  49,102 morphological descriptions,
  52,954 apparent major and minor axis,
  67,116 apparent magnitudes,
  20,046 radial velocities and
  24,361 position angles.

The Lyon-Meudon Extragalactic Database was eventually expanded into HyperLEDA, a database of a few million galaxies. Galaxies in the original PGC catalogue are numbered with their original PGC number in HyperLEDA. Numbers have also been assigned for the other galaxies, although for those galaxies not in the original PGC catalogue, it is not recommended to use that number as a name.

Examples

PGC 39058
PGC 39058 is a dwarf galaxy which is located approximately 14 million light-years away in the constellation of Draco. It is relatively nearby, however it is obscured by a bright star which is in front of the galaxy.

PGC 6240
PGC 6240 (also known as White Rose Galaxy) is a large lenticular galaxy in the constellation Hydrus. It is located about 346 million light-years away from Earth.

See also
 :Category:Principal Galaxies Catalogue objects
 Astronomical catalogue

References

External links
 PGC info at ESO's archive of astronomical catalogues
 PGC readme at Centre de Données astronomiques de Strasbourg.

Astronomical catalogues of galaxies
1989 documents
 
1989 in science